Joseph Lennox Federal (January 13, 1910 – August 31, 2000) was an American prelate of the Roman Catholic Church. He served as bishop of the Diocese of Salt Lake City in Utah from 1960 to 1980.  He previously served as an auxiliary bishop and coadjutor bishop of the same diocese from 1951 to 1960.

Biography

Early life 
Joseph Federal was born in Greensboro, North Carolina, to Charles and Margaret (née Keegan) Federal. He studied at Belmont Abbey College in Belmont, North Carolina, Niagara University in Niagara Falls, New York, the University of Fribourg in Fribourg, Switzerland, and the Pontifical North American College in Rome.

Priesthood 
Federal was ordained a priest for the Diocese of Raleigh on December 8, 1934. He then served as a curate at St. Peter's Parish in Greenville, North Carolina, and was the first pastor of St. Margaret's Parish in Swannanoa, North Carolina, (1937-1938). He was rector of Sacred Heart Cathedral (1938-1951), and became a papal chamberlain in 1942.

Auxiliary Bishop, Coadjutor Bishop and Bishop of Salt Lake 
On February 5, 1951, Federal was appointed auxiliary bishop of the Diocese of Salt Lake City and titular bishop of Appiaria by Pope Pius XII. He received his episcopal consecration on April 11, 1951, from Cardinal Amleto Cicognani, with Bishops Eugene J. McGuinness and Vincent Waters serving as co-consecrators. 

Federal was named coadjutor bishop of Salt Lake City on May 1, 1958 by Pope John XXIII.  He automatically succeeded Duane Hunt as the sixth Bishop upon the latter's death on March 31, 1960.

Federal attended the Second Vatican Council in Rome from 1962 to 1965. During Federal's tenure, crews replaced the slate roof of the Cathedral of the Madeleine with copper along with some sandstone blocks and gargoyles. In 1970, he had the cathedral bells toll as the hearse carrying the body of LDS President David O. McKay passed by.

Retirement and legacy 
On April 22, 1980, Pope John Paul II accepted Federal's resignation as bishop of the Diocese of Salt Lake. Joseph Federal died on August 31, 2000 at age 90.

References

1910 births
2000 deaths
Belmont Abbey College alumni
People from Greensboro, North Carolina
Roman Catholic bishops of Salt Lake City
20th-century Roman Catholic bishops in the United States
Participants in the Second Vatican Council
Niagara University alumni
Catholics from North Carolina